Windscoop Bluff is a rock bluff east-northeast of Birthday Bluffs on the south side of Mason Spur, Hillary Coast, Ross Dependency. The bluff rises to about 1000 m and is marked at the base by a large windscoop. The name was suggested by geologist Anne C. Wright, Department of Geoscience, New Mexico Institute of Mining and Technology, Socorro, who examined the bluff in 1983–84.

Cliffs of the Ross Dependency
Hillary Coast